Nyceryx mielkei is a moth of the  family Sphingidae. It is known from Brazil.

References

Nyceryx
Moths described in 2009